Bolozon is a commune in the Ain department in eastern France. Cize—Bolozon station has rail connections to Bourg-en-Bresse and Oyonnax.

Population

See also
Communes of the Ain department

References

Communes of Ain
Ain communes articles needing translation from French Wikipedia